Quileute ,  sometimes alternatively anglicized as Quillayute , is an extinct language, and was the last Chimakuan language, spoken natively until the end of the 20th century by Quileute and Makah elders on the western coast of the Olympic peninsula south of Cape Flattery at La Push and the lower Hoh River in Washington state, United States. The name Quileute comes from kʷoʔlí·yot’ , the name of a village at La Push.

Quileute is polysynthetic and words can be quite long.

Use and revitalization efforts 

There were ten elderly speakers in 1977, and “a few” in 1999. The Quileute Nation is attempting to prevent the loss of the language by teaching it in the Quileute Tribal School, using books written for the students by the tribal elders.

[In 2007], the Tribal Council set up a two-year Quileute Revitalization Project with the goal of encouraging the use of Quileute words and phrases in everyday village life. A basic vocabulary of greetings, questions, numbers, names of things, and “one-liners” in Quileute were made available to tribal members and staff through informal classes, email and computer CDs.

Phonology
Quileute has three phonemic short vowels /ä, e, o/ (written ‹a, i, o›) and four long vowels /äː, æː, eː, oː/ (written ‹a·, a̱·, i·, o·›). The vowels exhibit quite a bit of allophonic variation. /ä/ accepts allophones ranging between a low of [ä] to a mid [ə], /e/ between [ɛ] and [ɪ] (rarely as high as [i]), and /o/ between [o] and [ʊ] (rarely [u]). The long vowels are somewhat more stable: /äː, æː, eː, oː/ realized mostly as [äː, æː, eː, oː].

Stress is usually penultimate, but not necessarily so. It had originally been described by Manuel Andrade as having had a phonemic pitch accent whereby each long vowel can host one of four pitch contours. However, later research by Jay Powell has shown that Andrade had overdistinguished and that Quileute has a simpler accentual system whereby primary stress (accompanied by a higher pitch as in English) usually falls on the penultimate syllable and some words also harbor secondary stress on a different syllable.

Quileute is notable as having no nasal consonants, a feature shared with a few unrelated languages in its immediate vicinity, namely, Makah, Nitinaht, Lushootseed and Twana. It has the following consonants (// and // are rare):

The plain voiceless stops and affricates are slightly aspirated. After an accented long vowel in the first syllable, they are preceded by anticipatory pre-aspiration. So, e.g., ‹dí·ḳa› ‘smoke’ is realized as [ˈdéˑʰqʰə], and ‹t̓ƚó·pa› ‘blue, green’ is realized as [ˈt͡ɬʼóˑʰpʰə]. Analogously, an ejective following an accented long vowel anticipates pre-glottalization, as in ‹á·c̓hit› ‘rich, chief’ is realized as [ˈʔä́ˑˀt͡ʃʼɪt(ʰ)] or even [ˈʔä́ˑʔᵊt͡ʃʼɪt(ʰ)]. In the same position, continuants (including /b/ and /d/ which descend from Proto-Chimakuan *m and *n) are lengthened themselves. E.g., ‹bí·baʔa·› ‘blind’ is realized as [ˈbɪ́ˑbːäʔäː] and ‹ʔí·ƚiƚ› ‘key’ as [ˈʔɪ́ˑɬːɪɬ].

Morphology
Quileute features a prefix system that changes depending on the physical characteristics of the person being spoken of, the speaker, or rarely the person being addressed. When speaking of a cross-eyed person,  is prefixed to each word. When speaking of a hunchback, the prefix  is used. Additional prefixes are also used for short men, "funny people", and people that have difficulty walking.

See also
 Chemakum language

References

External links
Quileute Nation: The Quileute  Language
Quileute Language Dictionary

Chimakuan languages
Languages of the United States
Endangered Chimakuan languages
Indigenous languages of Washington (state)